José Rueda (born 8 March 1900, date of death unknown) was a Brazilian footballer. He played in one match for the Brazil national football team in 1925. He was also part of Brazil's squad for the 1925 South American Championship.

References

1900 births
Year of death missing
Brazilian footballers
Brazil international footballers
Place of birth missing
Association football defenders
Sport Club Corinthians Paulista players